Nunna is a part of Vijayawada in Krishna district of the Indian state of Andhra Pradesh. It is the headquarters of Vijayawada (rural) mandal in Vijayawada revenue division. As per the G.O. No. M.S.104 (dated:23-03-2017), Municipal Administration and Urban Development Department, it became a part of Vijayawada metropolitan area. The biggest Mango market in Asia, called Nunna Mango Market is located at Nunna. And 400 kv Vijayawada Power grid is also here. Polavaram Right Canal goes through Nunna. And State Capital Vijayawada-Amaravati Inner Ring Road is covering the Nunna.

Transport 

Nunna is located at north of Vijayawada and lies on Nuzvid - Vijayawada state highway. Vijayawada Jn. is the nearest Railway station to Nunna at about 10 km from Nunna. The satellite stations Gunadala, Ramavarappadu, Mustabada are also nearby railway stations. Vijayawada International Airport located at Gannavaram is the nearest Airport about 15 km from Nunna.

References 

Neighbourhoods in Vijayawada
Mandal headquarters in Krishna district